Carol Beach York (January 21, 1928 – April 26, 2013) was an American author of juvenile novels. Hailing from Chicago, Illinois, she is best known for novels in the mystery/suspense genre, and for the Butterfield Square Series, which includes Good Charlotte, from which the pop rock band Good Charlotte took its name.

Selected works
 Sparrow Lake, Coward-McCann (1962) No ISBN available; Lib of Cong # 62-8620
 One Summer, Coward-McCann (1963) No ISBN available; Lib of Cong #63-10168
 Miss Know-It-All, F. Watts (1966) No ISBN available
 The Christmas Dolls, illustrated by Victoria de Larrea, F. Watts (1967) No ISBN available
 The Christmas Dolls, (paperback) Scholastic Inc. (1967)  - "Doll-sized fantasy that works well enough for very little, very girly girls--not too silly, not too sweet."
 The Good Day Mice, illustrated by Victoria de Larrea, F. Watts (1968) No ISBN available; Lib of Cong # 68-16600 - "Minor mice ellany despite some langy drawings."
 The Blue Umbrella, Franklin Watts (1968) No ISBN available; Lib of Cong # 68-10107
 The Christmas Dolls, Chatto & Windus (Britain) (1969) 
 Good Charlotte, illustrated by Victoria de Larrea, F. Watts (1969) No ISBN available; Lib of Cong 71-79850
 Nothing Ever Happens Here, Hawthorn Books (1970) No ISBN available; Lib of Cong # 75-106180
 Miss Know-It-All Returns, illustrated by Victoria de Larrea, F. Watts (1972) 
 Mystery at Dark Wood, Watts (1972) No ISBN available
 The Secret of the Tree House, formerly published as The Tree House Mystery, Weekly Reader Books (1973) No ISBN available
 Takers and Returners, Thomas Nelson, Inc. (1973)  - "Slight on characterization and atmosphere, Takers and Returners nevertheless accurately and suspensefully demonstrates the dynamics of a dare."
 I Will Make You Disappear, T. Nelson (1974) 
 Beware of This Shop, Thomas Nelson Publishers (1977) No ISBN available
 Remember Me When I'm Dead, Elsevier/Nelson (1980) 
 The Look-Alike Girl, Beaufort Books (1980) 
 Washington Irving's Rip Van Winkle, written by Washington Irving, illustrated by Kinuko Y. Craft, Troll Associates (1980) 
 Stray Dog, Beaufort Books (1981) 
 Candles in the Window, Dutton (1982)
 Miss Know-it-All and the Wishing Lamp, illustrated by Leslie Merrill, Bantam Books (1987) 
 Pudmuddles, illustrated by Lisa Thiesing, HarperCollins (1993) 
 The Key to the Playhouse, Scholastic Inc. (1994)

References 

American children's writers
1928 births
2013 deaths
Writers from Chicago